Martin Lake is a  remote northern lake of Saskatchewan, Canada, located near Uranium City, Saskatchewan.

There has been extensive Uranium exploration in the area surrounding the lake.

See also
List of lakes of Saskatchewan

References

Lakes of Saskatchewan